Farid Benstiti (born 16 January 1967) is a French football coach and former player who played as a midfielder. He last managed OL Reign in the National Women's Soccer League.

Benstiti started his playing career in 1984 for Olympique Lyonnais. In 1989, he moved to Cercle Dijon, and he subsequently played for AS Lyon-Duchère, FC Sète and Avenir Lembeek in the French and Belgian third tiers, and Vaulx-en-Velin and Gap FC in lower categories. He retired in 2000 at 33.

Benstiti is best known for his managerial career in women's football, which started in 2001 as he was appointed Olympique Lyonnais' manager. Under Benstiti Olympique won four championships in a row between 2007 and 2010 and reached the 2010 Champions League's final, lost to Turbine Potsdam on penalties. However, he left the position after the 2010 season. In September 2011 he signed for the Russian national team and months later he also took charge of Russian champion WFC Rossiyanka, replacing Vera Pauw and Tatiana Egorova respectively. In July 2012 he left both positions and returned to France for personal reasons. He then signed for Paris Saint-Germain.

On 22 Dec 2016, Chinese club Dalian Quanjian officially signed Benstiti as their new manager.

On 17 January 2020, Benstiti was appointed the head coach of Reign FC. He resigned on July 2, 2021; Benstiti was later named in the Yates Report for abusive behavior regarding weight-shaming players.

References

1966 births
Living people
Footballers from Lyon
French footballers
Association football midfielders
French football managers
Expatriate football managers in Russia
National team coaches
French sportspeople of Algerian descent
Olympique Lyonnais Féminin managers
Russia women's national football team managers
Paris Saint-Germain Féminine managers
Dalian Quanjian F.C. managers
Expatriate football managers in China
OL Reign coaches
National Women's Soccer League coaches
FC Vaulx-en-Velin players